YTV Jr. (formerly known as The Treehouse) was a block on YTV for preschoolers that was launched in 1994 and aired weekdays until 2002.

History
When YTV launched, it had a block of programs for preschoolers with a focus on Canadian content. In 1991, YTV began airing host segments during the block featuring their PJs (Program Jockeys) and the Grogs (replaced by The Fuzzpaws in 1994).

In 1994, YTV's preschool block received the name The Treehouse. While most of YTV's hosted blocks had one or two hosts, The Treehouse was hosted by one or two of three PJs, Katie, Krista, and/or Todd, and one of The Fuzzpaws. As the name suggests, it was set in a tree house. On Fridays, PJ Katie would act out stories with clay animals; these segments were eventually spun off into the series PJ Katie's Farm. Following the launch of Treehouse TV in 1997, The Treehouse received new bumpers and a new set.

YTV relaunched The Treehouse on September 7, 1998 as YTV Jr. The Treehouse host segments were replaced with short series (some produced by YTV in-house) and promos. The Fuzzpaws got their own short series on YTV Jr., and PJ Katie became Jenny on The Zone. YTV dropped the YTV Jr. branding from its morning lineup in mid-2002. From 2010 to 2012, YTV aired YTV PlayTime, a three-hour commercial-free block of animated series for older preschoolers.

Programs

The Treehouse

 The Adventures of Peter Pan (1997–98)
 Ballooner Landing (1994–98)
 Barney & Friends (1997)
 Bertha (1994–95)
 Brownstone Kids (1994–95)
 Camp Cariboo (1994–97)
 Casper and Friends (1995–97)
 Charlie Chalk (1994–95)
 Dino Babies (1995–97)
 Dragon Flyz (1996–98)
 The Friendly Giant (1994–95)
 Hands Up Hands On (1994–96)
 Hello Kitty and Friends (1995–97)
 Keroppi and Friends (1995–97)
 Lamb Chop's Play-Along (1994–97)
 Madeline (1995–97)
 Maya the Bee (1994–95; 1997–98)
 Marie-Soleil (1995–98)
 The Poddington Peas (1994–95)
 Poetree and Friends (1994–97)
 Princess Gwenevere and the Jewel Riders (1996–98)
 Puttnam's Prairie Emporium (1994–95)
 Romper Room (1994–95)
 Rupert (1994–95)
 Size Small (1994–95)
 Sky Dancers (1996–98)
 Take Off (1994–95)
 Take Part (1994–95; 1997–98)
 Tell-a-Tale Town (1996–98)
 Under the Umbrella Tree (1994–98)
 Waterville Gang (1994–95)
 What-a-Mess (1995–98)

YTV Jr.

 The Adventures of Dudley the Dragon (1995–2002)
 The Adventures of Spot (1999–2001)
 Anatole (1999–2002)
 Angelina Ballerina (2001–02)
 Animal Stories (1999–2000)
 Anthony Ant (1999–2002)
 Archibald the Koala (1999–2001)
 Artifacts (2000)
 Babar (2001–02)
 Bananas in Pyjamas (1995–99)
 Bedtime Stories (1998–2001)
 Beezoo's Attic (1998–2001)
 The Big Comfy Couch (1994–99)
 Big Sister, Little Brother (1999–2000)
 The Bittles (2002)
 Blue's Clues (1998–99)
 Bob the Builder (2001)
 Bump (2000)
 Chip'n Orbit (2001–02)
 The Country Mouse and the City Mouse Adventures (1999–2002)
 The Crayon Box (1998–2001)
 Dawdle the Donkey (1998–2002)
 Dumb Bunnies (2000–01)
 Elliot Moose (2000–02)
 Enchanted Lands: Magic of the Faraway Tree (1998–2001)
 The Forgotten Toys (2000–01)
 The Fuzzpaws (1998–2002)
 George and Martha (1999–2002)
 Groundling Marsh (1994–2000)
 Happy Birthday (1998–2001)
 Jellabies (2000–01)
 Judy & David's Boombox (1999–2001)
 Kipper (1998–2000)
 Kitty Cats (1995–2001)
 Kleo the Misfit Unicorn (2000–02)
 Lisa
 Little Bear (2001–02)
 Little Big Kid (1998–2000)
 The Magic Key (2002)
 Maisy (1999–2001)
 Mamemo (2000–01)
 Mopatop's Shop (1999–2001)
 My Special Book (1998–2000)
 Nanalan' (1998–2002)
 Once Upon a Hamster (1995–2001)
 Oswald (2002)
 Pablo the Little Red Fox (2000–01)
 Painting Pictures (2000)
 Panda Bear Daycare (1998–2001)
 Percy the Park Keeper (1999–2000)
 Pet Squad (1998–2000)
 Philipp, the Mouse
 PJ Katie's Farm (August 14, 1995–99)
 Plonsters (1999–2000)
 Pocket Dragon Adventures (1998–99)
 Postman Pat (1994–95, 1999–2000)
 Pumper Pups (2000)
 Ruffus the Dog (1998–2002)
 Rupert (1997–2002)
 Sailor Moon (1995–99)
 Seven Little Monsters (2002)
 Sheeep (2000–02)
 Shining Time Station (1994–99)
 Spider! (1998–2000)
 St. Bear's Dolls Hospital (2000–01)
 The Toothbrush Family (1998–2000)
 Turtle Island (2001)
 The Twins (2000–01)
 Ted Sieger's Wildlife (2000–01)
 The Wind in the Willows (2000)
 Works

YTV PlayTime
 Babar and the Adventures of Badou (2010–11)
 The Berenstain Bears (2009–12)
 Big & Small (2011–12)
 Caillou (2010-12)
 Dora the Explorer (2009-12)
 Erky Perky (2009–12)
 Flying Rhino Junior High (2010–12)
 George Shrinks (2010–12)
 Little Bear (2010–12)
 Maggie and the Ferocious Beast (2010)
 Rescue Heroes (2011–12)
 Rolie Polie Olie (2009-2010)
 Timothy Goes to School (2009–12)
 Toot & Puddle (2011–12)
 Willa's Wild Life (2009–11)
 Will and Dewitt (2010)
 Zigby (2011–12)

References

Preschool education television networks
Television programming blocks in Canada
YTV (Canadian TV channel) original programming